Acanthosaura coronata is a species of  agamid lizard commonly known as the crowned spiny lizard. They are found in the lowland tropical forests of eastern Cambodia (type location) and Vietnam (Lam Dong and Dong Nai provinces), where they are diurnal. Although often found near the ground, they have cryptic colouration and climb trees when threatened.

References

External links 

Acanthosaura
Reptiles of Cambodia
Reptiles of Vietnam
Reptiles described in 1861
Taxa named by Albert Günther